Theater Hof is a theatre in the German city of Hof, Bavaria.

External links 
 Theater Hof: Homepage

Theatres in Bavaria
Hof, Bavaria